Vanaja VAKS, later called Vanaja AS-33 is a two-axle, 4×2-driven military lorry produced by the Finnish heavy vehicle producer Vanajan Autotehdas (VAT) in 1960–1963. The biggest customer was Finnish Defence Forces.

Use 
The first seven units were handed over to the Finnish Defence Forces on 9 December 1960; however, the measurement drawings were dated just on 31 December, i.e. after the first lorries were already taken into use. The Defence Forces ordered 155 units in total. Most of the vehicles were stationed in transportation units.

In the model name VAK stands for Vanaja lorry and S means soldier or military. VAT changed its model nomenclature system in 1961 after which the VAK was replaced by A. S remained indicating that the model was designated mainly for military use. A number was added to show the engine type; the volume model was with 330 cubic inch Ford Trader engine and therefore named AS-33.

Technical data

Engine 
The first models were powered by Ford Trader 510E six-cylinder, 108-hp diesels. In addition, two Bedford petrol engines were used: 3.52-litre Bedford J4 and 4.9-litre Bedford D4 of which latter were only produced three units. Two units were powered by Leyland 0.375 and one by Leyland 0.400.

Transmission 
The gearbox is produced by Fuller and the type is 5B-330. The rear axle is Timken TJ-140.

Sources

References 

Vaks
Military trucks of Finland
Military vehicles introduced in the 1960s
Vehicles introduced in 1960